Arsen Davidovich Khubulov (born 13 December 1990) is a Russian professional football player. He plays as a right winger.

Club career
He made his Russian Premier League debut for FC Alania Vladikavkaz on 10 May 2010 in a game against FC Spartak Moscow and scored the fourth goal in a 5–2 victory.

On 4 February 2019, he signed with FC Yenisey Krasnoyarsk.

On 14 February 2020, he joined Kazakhstan Premier League club FC Shakhter Karagandy.

Career statistics

Notes

Honours

FC Alania Vladikavkaz
 Russian Cup (1): Runner-up 2010-11

FC Kuban Krasnodar
 Russian Cup (1): Runner-up 2014-15

References

External links
 

1990 births
Sportspeople from Vladikavkaz
Living people
Russian footballers
Russia under-21 international footballers
Association football midfielders
Russian Premier League players
FC Spartak Vladikavkaz players
FC Kuban Krasnodar players
FC Anzhi Makhachkala players
FC Yenisey Krasnoyarsk players
FC Shakhter Karagandy players
Süper Lig players
Russian expatriate footballers
Expatriate footballers in Turkey
Expatriate footballers in Kazakhstan